Foldnes is a village in Øygarden municipality in Vestland county, Norway.  The village is located on the northwestern shore of the island of Litlesotra, just north of the village of Straume.  The Foldnes Church is located in this village, and it serves the people of the island of Litlesotra.

References

Villages in Vestland
Øygarden